Italy participated in the Eurovision Song Contest 2012 in Baku, Azerbaijan. The Italian entry was selected through an internal selection, organised by the Italian broadcaster RAI. The artist was selected by a special committee from the participants of the Sanremo Music Festival 2012 and the song selection was carried out by the artist. Nina Zilli represented Italy with the song "L'amore è femmina (Out of Love)", which placed 9th in the final, scoring 101 points.

Internal selection

Artist selection

On 16 January 2012, Italian broadcaster RAI confirmed that the performer that would represent Italy at the 2012 Eurovision Song Contest would be selected by a special committee from the competing artists at the Sanremo Music Festival 2012. The competition took place between 14–18 February 2012 with the winner being selected on the last day of the festival. The competing artists in the "Big Artists" and "Newcomers" category were:

"Big Artists" Category

Arisa
Chiara Civello
Dolcenera
Emma Marrone
Eugenio Finardi
Francesco Renga
Gigi D'Alessio and Loredana Bertè
Irene Fornaciari
Marlene Kuntz
Matia Bazar
Nina Zilli
Noemi
Pierdavide Carone and Lucio Dalla
Samuele Bersani

"Newcomers" Category

Alessandro Casillo
Bidiel
Celeste Gaia
Erica Mou
Giordana Angi
Giulia Anania
Iohosemprevoglia
Marco Guazzone

During the final evening of the Sanremo Music Festival 2012, Nina Zilli was announced as the artist that would represent Italy at the Eurovision Song Contest 2012. Emma Marrone was selected as the winner with the song "Non è l'inferno".

Song selection
On 3 March 2012, RAI confirmed that Nina Zilli would perform her Sanremo Music Festival 2012 song "Per sempre" at the Eurovision Song Contest 2012. However, RAI later confirmed on 13 March 2012 that Zilli would perform "L'amore è femmina (Out of Love)" at the Eurovision Song Contest 2012 instead.

At Eurovision
Italy automatically qualified to compete in the final on 26 May 2012 as part of the "Big Five". Italy was drawn to perform tenth, after France and preceding Estonia. Italy achieved 9th place with 101 points, finishing in the top ten for a second consecutive year. The televote awarded Italy 17th place with 56 points and the jury awarded 4th place with 157 points.

Voting

Points awarded to Italy

Points awarded by Italy

References 

2012
Countries in the Eurovision Song Contest 2012
Eurovision
Eurovision